Hugo Salvador Ginel (born 1 April 1938) is an Argentine former footballer who competed in the 1960 Summer Olympics.

References

1938 births
Living people
Association football defenders
Argentine footballers
Olympic footballers of Argentina
Footballers at the 1960 Summer Olympics
Atlético Tucumán footballers
Sportspeople from San Miguel de Tucumán